Dharmendra Yadav (born 3 February 1979) is an Indian politician from Uttar Pradesh. He was a Member of Parliament (MP) in the 16th Lok Sabha representing Badaun constituency as Samajwadi Party candidate.

Early life and education 
Dharmendra Yadav was born in Saifai, Etawah on 3 February 1979 to Abhay Ram Yadav and Jay Devi. 

His father Abhay Ram Yadav is the younger brother of Mulayam Singh Yadav and elder brother of Shivpal Singh Yadav. Samajwadi Party's President Akhilesh Yadav is Dharmendra's cousin.

He received a Bachelor of Laws degree and a MA degree in political Science from the University of Allahabad.

Family

He has one brother Anurag Yadav and two sisters Sandhya Yadav and Sheela Yadav. Sheela's son Rahul Yadav is married to Dr Isha Yadav, daughter of Sadhu Yadav.

His brother Anurag Yadav contested the 2017 UP assembly election from Sarojini Nagar.

Personal life
Dharmendra Yadav married Neelam Yadav on 12 February 2010.

Political career
He was elected to the 14th Lok Sabha in 2004 from Mainpuri and re-elected to the 15th Lok Sabha in 2009 and 16th Lok Sabha in 2014 from Badaun. He has been a member of the standing committees on defence, rural development, information technology and agriculture.

He lost the 2019 Lok Sabha election from Badaun by around 18,000 votes. In June 2022 Azamgarh by-poll he lost the election by around 8,600 votes.

Positions held 
Dharmendra Yadav has been elected 3 times as Lok Sabha MP.

References

India MPs 2014–2019
Living people
People from Saifai
1979 births
Lok Sabha members from Uttar Pradesh
Samajwadi Party politicians from Uttar Pradesh
India MPs 2004–2009
India MPs 2009–2014
People from Etawah district
Yadav family of Uttar Pradesh